Sebastián Eduardo Aset Merino (born 25 April 1979) is a former Argentine footballer who played as a forward in club football in Argentina, Chile, Uruguay, Venezuela, Germany, Australia and Indonesia.

Career
Born in General Alvear, Buenos Aires Province, Aset began playing professional football in the lower divisions of Argentine football. He would embark on a journeyman's career, enjoying a spell in the Chilean Primera División with Cobresal during 2007. He joined C.A. Progreso during the 2007–08 Uruguayan Primera División season, scoring a game-winning goal against C.A. Fénix in an unsuccessful attempt to avoid relegation.

References

External links
 
 

1979 births
Living people
Argentine footballers
Argentine expatriate footballers
UA Maracaibo players
El Tanque Sisley players
CSyD Tristán Suárez footballers
C.A. Progreso players
Cobresal footballers
Lota Schwager footballers
Unión San Felipe footballers
C.D. Arturo Fernández Vial footballers
Chilean Primera División players
Primera B de Chile players
Expatriate footballers in Chile
Expatriate footballers in Uruguay
Expatriate footballers in Venezuela
Expatriate footballers in Germany
Expatriate soccer players in Australia
Expatriate footballers in Indonesia
German footballers needing infoboxes
Association football forwards
Sportspeople from Mendoza, Argentina